Visayaseguenzia maestratii is a species of sea snail, a marine gastropod mollusk in the family Seguenziidae.

Description
The size of the shell varies between 1.6 mm and 2.8 mm.

Distribution
This marine species occurs off the Philippines.

References

External links
 

maestratii
Gastropods described in 2006